Norway competed at the 1960 Winter Olympics in Squaw Valley, United States.

Medalists

Alpine skiing

Men

Women

Biathlon

Men

 1 Two minutes added per missed target.

Cross-country skiing

Men

Men's 4 × 10 km relay

Nordic combined 

Events:
 normal hill ski jumping 
 15 km cross-country skiing

Ski jumping

Speed skating

Men

References
 Official Olympic Reports
 International Olympic Committee results database
 Olympic Winter Games 1960, full results by sports-reference.com

Nations at the 1960 Winter Olympics
1960
1960 in Norwegian sport